Lewellyn Park is a public park in Troutdale, Oregon, United States. The  park was dedicated by developers of Sandee Palisades Subdivision in February 1981.

References

External links

 

1981 establishments in Oregon
Parks in Multnomah County, Oregon
Troutdale, Oregon